Pimampiro Canton is a canton of Ecuador, located in Imbabura Province.  Its population in the 2001 census was 12,951 and 12,970 in the 2010 census.

Pimampiro is located in the Andes of northern Ecuador.

Demographics
Ethnic groups as of the Ecuadorian census of 2010:
Mestizo  73.4%
Indigenous  13.5%
Afro-Ecuadorian  10.2%
White  2.6%
Montubio  0.2%
Other  0.1%

References

External links 
 Map of Imbabura Province

Cantons of Imbabura Province